The Hlincea Monastery is a Romanian Orthodox monastery in Ciurea, Iaşi metropolitan area, Romania. 

Located at the base of Cetăţuia Hill, the monastery was built by Maria, the daughter of Moldavian Prince Petru Şchiopul and dedicated in 1574. At the middle of the next century, it was rebuilt by Prince Vasile Lupu and finished by his son Ştefăniţă, in November 1660.

The monastery is listed in the National Register of Historic Monuments.

References

External links

 Hlincea Monastery official website
 Churches and monasteries in Iaşi at Iași City Hall website

Historic monuments in Iași County
Romanian Orthodox monasteries of Iași County
Christian monasteries established in the 16th century
1574 establishments in Romania
16th-century architecture in Romania